The Center Game is a chess opening that begins with the moves:
1. e4 e5
2. d4 exd4

The game usually continues 3.Qxd4 Nc6,  with a gain of tempo for Black due to the attack on the white queen. (Note that 3.c3 is considered a separate opening: the Danish Gambit.)

General concepts

White's 2nd move challenges the center by attacking the e-pawn and also opening up the d- for the rook and queen to attack, but at the cost of moving the queen early and allowing Black to develop with a tempo with 3...Nc6. In White's favor, after 4.Qe3, the most commonly played retreat, the position of the white queen hinders Black's ability to play ...d5. The  is cleared of pieces quickly which facilitates  castling and may allow White to quickly develop an attack. From e3, the white queen may later move to g3 where she will pressure Black's g7-square.

History

The Center Game is an old opening. It was mostly abandoned by 1900 because no advantage could be demonstrated for White. Jacques Mieses, Savielly Tartakower and Rudolf Spielmann seemed to be the last strong players who would adopt it. The Center Game was rarely played by elite players until Alexander Shabalov revived it in the 1980s. Later, Alexei Shirov, Michael Adams, Judit Polgár and Alexander Morozevich also contributed to the theory of the Center Game by forcing re-evaluation of lines long thought to favor Black. In recent years, Ian Nepomniachtchi has also experimented with the opening.

Variations

3.Qxd4 Nc6
The nearly universal sequence of moves in the Center Game is 3.Qxd4 Nc6 (ECO code C22). Now White has a choice of retreat squares for the queen. Although 4.Qa4 corresponds to a fairly commonly played variation of the Scandinavian Defense (1.e4 d5 2.exd5 Qxd5 3.Nc3 Qa5) reversed, it is rarely played in the Center Game because tournament experience has not been favorable for White in this line.

The best move for the queen seems to be 4.Qe3, known as Paulsen's Attack. White intends to castle queenside in this line. Black usually continues 4...Nf6 when a typical line continues 5.Nc3 Bb4 6.Bd2 0-0 7.0-0-0 Re8. White may try to complicate play by means of the pawn sacrifice 8.Qg3!? intending 8...Rxe4 9.a3! – Shabalov's move. Black's best reply seems to be the  9...Ba5. Even though this line gives White some compensation for the pawn, it is probably fine for Black.

A more solid option for Black is the natural 5...Be7! intending ...d7–d5 (sometimes even after White plays 6.Bc4), opening up lines as soon as possible. Black also seems to get a good game with 4...g6, and 4...Bb4+ has been played successfully as well.

3.c3

3.Nf3 or 3.Bc4
Postponing recapture of the queen pawn is a standard idea in the Scandinavian Defense (1.e4 d5 2.exd5 Nf6), but 3.Nf3 is less commonly played in the Center Game. Black can safely transpose to the Scotch Game, Petrov's Defense or the Philidor Defense, or play a line recommended by Alexander Alekhine, 3...Bc5 4.Nxd4 Nf6 and now 5.e5 would be met with 5...Qe7. Similar ideas are possible after 3.Bc4, which is also uncommon. 3.Bc4 is referred to in older chess works as the Center Gambit.

3.f4?! (Halasz Gambit)
The Halasz Gambit (3.f4?!) is another rare try. Although the move dates back to at least 1840, it has been championed more recently by the Hungarian correspondence player Dr. György Halasz. The gambit seems dubious but it has not been definitively refuted.

References

Further reading

External links

Tim Harding on the Halasz Gambit
Tim Harding on the Center Game

Chess openings